Matadin Valmiki  was an Indian freedom fighter who played a key part in the events immediately preceding the outbreak of the Indian rebellion of 1857. He was a Valmiki worker in a cartridge manufacturing unit of British East India Company. He was the first person who sowed seeds of the 1857 revolt.

History
According to historical narratives, Matadin was a worker in a Cartridge manufacturing unit of East India Company. He was employed there as during those times working with leathers and skin of dead animals was considered as the occupation of low castes. The orthodox upper caste Hindus used to consider them as "impure". One day Mangal Pandey, a soldier in the company's service was asked for water by Matadin but due to age old belief of touching a low caste person as "polluting", he refused. Matadin thus made him realise that it is paradoxical that he is proud of his birth in a high Caste Brahmin family, but still he bites the cartridges which are made up of the fat of cows and pigs with his mouth. This propelled both Hindu as well as Muslim soldiers of the company to raise the banner of revolt as, while the cow was considered as sacred for Hindus,  the pigs were forbidden for Muslims.

According to Subaltern historians as well as Dalit activists, he should be recognised as the real face behind the revolt of 1857. This is because he was the person who made Mangal Pandey aware of the fact that their religious sentiments are being hurt knowingly or unknowingly by the British. Thus, he was first person who sowed seeds of the 1857 revolt.

Legacy
In 2015, Meerut Municipal Corporation named Hapur Adda crossing at Meerut as Shaheed Matadin Chowk as a tribute to him.

See also
 Barrackpore Mutiny of 1824
 Mangal Pandey
 Gangu Baba

References

Revolutionaries of the Indian Rebellion of 1857
1857 deaths
British East India Company Army soldiers
Prisoners and detainees of British India
Barrackpore
Indian independence activists from Uttar Pradesh